The Hong Kong Top Footballers Awards, established by the Hong Kong Football Association in 1978, recognizes the top performers for each season's Hong Kong Premier League. The prizes are decided according to the votes from mass media and the general public. The Best Eleven Squad are voted by the public, Premier League coaches and managers and staff from different mass media. The votes from public counts 30% and the remaining 70% are from the professionals. Some other newer prizes include Best Youth Player, Best Foreign Player and Best Coach Award. In 2004, the Most Popular Player Award was established and in the same year, named sponsorship was used. There were some special prizes given out during the history, which includes the Silver Jubilee Footballer Award for Wu Kwok Hung in 2003 and Hong Kong Broadcasting 75th Anniversary Honour Award for Yiu Cheuk Yin, Tam Kong Pak and Ko Po Keung in 2004.

Different categories of award

Hong Kong Top Footballers
For the full team lists of Hong Kong Top Footballers, please refer to List of Hong Kong Top Footballers.

2020–21

Footballer of the Year

Multiple-time Footballer of the Year Winners 

 4 – Wu Kwok Hung
 3 – Lee Kin Wo
 2 – Leung Sui Wing, Chan Fat Chi, Leslie Santos, Au Wai Lun, Li Haiqiang

Best Young Player

Coach of the Year

Most Favourite Player

Women’s Footballer of the Year

Defunct awards

Best Foreign Player

Footballers in Hong Kong
Association football trophies and awards
1978 establishments in Hong Kong
Awards established in 1978
Hong Kong awards
Annual events in Hong Kong
Association football player non-biographical articles